The Badger Mountain Centennial Preserve protects Badger Mountain, located on the edge of Richland in Washington, provides views of the Tri-Cities as well as the Columbia and Yakima rivers. Trails are open for hiking. No motorized vehicles are allowed.

A non-profit group, Friends of Badger Mountain, worked to procure this shrub-steppe area that has most native vegetation intact and then built a trail to the summit.

Expansion
Friends of Badger Mountain is working to raise $1.5 million for a purchase of 205 acres of land around Candy Mountain to expand the preserve and create trails on that mountain. This is the next step toward reaching their goal of creating a  trail connecting Little Badger Mountain, Badger Mountain, Candy Mountain and Red Mountain.

References

Tri-Cities, Washington
Nature reserves in Washington (state)
Protected areas of Benton County, Washington